Stanzione is a surname. Notable people with the surname include:

Massimo Stanzione (1586–1656), Italian painter
Vince Stanzione (born 1968/69), British businessman
Dominick Stanzione, American hospital administrator

Italian-language surnames